π Pavonis, Latinized as Pi Pavonis, is a candidate astrometric binary star system in the constellation Pavo. It is a white-hued star that is visible to the naked eye as a faint point of light with an apparent visual magnitude of 4.33. The distance to this object is 130 light years based on parallax, but it is drifting closer to the Sun with a radial velocity of −15.6 km/s.

The visible component is an chemically peculiar star that displays an abundance anomaly of strontium. Grey et al. (1989) classify it as kA4hF0mF2 III, matching a giant Am star with the calcium K line of an A4 star, the hydrogen lines of a cooler F0 star, and the metal lines of a F2 star. However, Loden and Sundman (1989) don't consider it to be a giant and list it as an Ap star. It is 630 million years old with 2.15 times the mass of the Sun and 2.8 times the Sun's radius. The star is radiating 24.7 times the Sun's luminosity from its photosphere at an effective temperature of 7,632 K.

References

A-type giants
Am stars
Pavo (constellation)
Pavonis, Pi
Durchmusterung objects
165040
088866
6745